Jo-Anne Lee Coe (July 19, 1933 – September 27, 2002) was the first woman to serve as Secretary of the United States Senate (1985–87), appointed by Bob Dole during his term as Senate Majority Leader in 1985.

Early life
Jo-Anne Lee Johnson was born in Coronado, California, daughter of Admiral Roy L. Johnson, former Commander in Chief, United States Pacific Fleet (1965–67), and the former Margaret Louise Gross.

Career
Coe worked as an aide to Harold D. Cooley in the 1960s. She joined the congressional office of Bob Dole in 1968 as a caseworker. She served as his Senate office manager and office manager during his vice presidential campaign with Gerald R. Ford. Coe was appointed as Secretary of the United States Senate by Bob Dole, Senate Majority Leader in 1985. She served in that role until 1987. She was the first woman to serve as secretary of the Senate.

After serving in this capacity, she founded and directed Senator Dole's political action committee, Campaign America. When Senator Dole formed a presidential exploratory committee in 1995, she was appointed Finance Director and also served as acting campaign manager until campaign manager Scott Reed joined the campaign staff. She continued in the role of Finance Director of the Dole campaign committee (see: 1996 United States presidential election) until she had raised the maximum allowable under federal campaign law, after which she transferred to the Republican National Committee as deputy finance chairman. 

After the campaign, Coe became Senator Dole's Chief of Staff and assisted in raising money for the National World War II Memorial, the Robert J. Dole Institute of Politics, and numerous other non-profit groups in which Senator Dole took a leadership role, as well as for Republican political candidates.

Personal life and death

While in college, she was briefly married to Benjamin P. Coe and had one daughter, Kathryn Lee Coe Coombs (1953-2011), who was married to British Member of Parliament Simon Coombs from 1983 to 2002. Her marriage with Coe ended in divorce.

Coe died on September 27, 2002, at Inova Fairfax Hospital in Falls Church, Virginia.

References
Jeff Gerth. "In Dole's World, She Is the Backstage Power." New York Times. Jan 28, 1996

External links

Secretaries of the United States Senate
1933 births
2002 deaths